Byron is a neighbourhood in the City of London, Ontario, Canada. It is adjacent to the Thames River in the south-west of London.  Almost all of its residents live in low-density, single detached dwellings. As of 2011, the area is home to 15,525 residents.

The neighbourhood is considered a high-income area, with an average family income of $130,587 an average dwelling value of $312,896 and a home ownership rate of 93%.

History
Byron was originally called Westminster, then renamed Hall's Mill, and then finally Byron;  named for the poet Lord Byron.  The Byron area was settled in 1800 and first became a village in 1804.  Up until 1857 the community was known as Hall's Mills, for Charles Hall, post master.  On March 7, 1961, it was annexed by the city of London  and the population grew substantially with the development of large subdivisions around the original village.

Government and politics
Byron exists within the federal electoral district of London West. It is currently represented by Arielle Kayabaga of the Liberal Party of Canada, first elected in 2021.

Provincially, the area is within the constituency of London West.  It is currently represented by Peggy Sattler of the New Democratic Party, first elected in 2013 and re-elected in 2014, 2018, and 2022.

In London's non-partisan municipal politics, Byron lies within ward 9.  It is currently represented by Councillor Anna Hopkins, first elected in 2014.

Education

Elementary schools

There are six publicly funded elementary schools in Byron:
 Byron Northview Public School
 Byron Somerset Public School
Opened in the early 1990s, this school has 337 students in JK to Grade 8. It was built in a former gravel pit, excavated by AAROC Aggregates. Its architecture was by the firm Lamb, Jorden and Jensen, which later became Carsten Jensen.
 Byron Southwood Public School
 St. George Catholic School
 St. Theresa Catholic School
 St. Nicholas Catholic School

The first three schools are under the jurisdiction of the Thames Valley District School Board and the latter three are part of the London District Catholic School Board.

Secondary schools
There are no secondary schools located in Byron (a source of some consternation to residents, as a secondary school was originally promised by the city of London when Byron was annexed).  Two publicly funded secondary schools serve the needs of Byron students.  The nearest is St. Thomas Aquinas Catholic Secondary School in the London District Catholic School Board, to the north across the Thames River.  This school primarily serves the needs of Roman Catholic students, though, as it is publicly funded, students of any religious denomination may attend.  Most secondary school age students in Byron choose to attend Saunders Secondary School in the Thames Valley District School Board in the Westmount suburb of London.  Though they do not live within the drawing area, a number of secondary school age children from Byron currently attend Oakridge Secondary School, located in the neighbourhood of Oakridge in London.

Private schools
There is one private (for profit) school in Byron.  This is a Montessori pre-school, located on Commissioners Road between Grand View Ave and Chestnut Hill.

Attractions
Byron is home to Springbank Park, a picturesque urban park and the largest in London. Within Springbank Park is Storybook Gardens, a popular children's attraction open year-round. Byron also has Boler Mountain, a small co-operative that offers skiing, snowboarding, snow-tubing, and mountain bike terrains.

Byron hosted two cycling events during the 2001 Canada Summer Games: the mountain biking event on Boler Mountain, and the road cycling event, where cyclists raced through the heart of the village.

Infrastructure

Byron Telephone Company
Byron was served until August 1960 by the Byron Telephone Company, when it was sold to Bell Canada.  A manual telephone exchange continued to operate until September 15, 1963, and in 1962 or 1963, the short code 471 was introduced to London exchange customers for the convenience of immediately reaching the Byron operator to complete a call.  Upon dial introduction, 471 became the exchange prefix.

However, some two or three years before 1960, the Byron Telephone Company converted its Lambeth-area customers to a dial exchange, the OLiver 2 exchange.

Location
The current boundaries of Byron are generally regarded to be the land south of the Thames River and west of Colonel Talbot Road.  Recent housing developments have expanded Byron southward to Southdale Road and westward to Wickerson Road.  Outside of the urban area, Byron is surrounded by farmland and forested areas.  On the eastern border of Byron is the Byron Gravel Pit, the sixteenth-largest gravel pit in Canada.  Historically, Byron also consisted of some land north of the Thames River in the area known today as Oakridge Park, including the Byron Bog (now Sifton Bog).

Controversy
In 2000, Tim Hortons, which had 44 locations throughout London, sought to open its first full-service location in Byron. At the time, Tim Horton's presence in Byron was limited to a kiosk inside the A&P grocery store with no seating, limited hours, and a limited menu.

Tim Hortons was met by bitter opposition from a small group of members of the community, which had also stopped an entry by Tim Hortons into Byron in 1998. Some members of the group claimed building a Tim Hortons would ruin the "small-town atmosphere," generating too much traffic and noise.

London City Council sided with local residents and refused to rezone a parcel of land along Commissioners Road to permit Tim Hortons to build a store there.  TDL Group Ltd. appealed the decision to the Ontario Municipal Board (OMB), which sided with TDL and ordered the city to permit the required rezoning.  Tim Hortons opened its Byron location in December 2001.

Notable Byronites
Megan Park, Actor
Ron Calhoun, executive director of Partners in Research
Jack McIntyre, hockey player
Rob Ramage, hockey player and vehicular manslaughter convict
Mike Van Ryn, hockey player
Tim Tindale, American football player
Andy Spruce, hockey player

References

External links
Byron Community Organization
Optimists Club of Byron

Neighbourhoods in London, Ontario